Gulu Rustam oghlu Asgarov (December 18, 1928 — June 11, 1987) was an Azerbaijani mugham and opera singer (lyrical-dramatic tenor), composer, khananda and pedagogue.

Biography 
Gulu Asgarov was born on December 18, 1928 in Salyan. At a young age, he performed at the district theater, led the ensemble of folk instruments. In 1953, he won the Republican Olympiad of Young Talents. Gulu Asgarov studied at the Baku Music College named after Asaf Zeynally in 1953–1958.

His tapes are protected by the AzTV Foundation. For many years, Gulu Asgarov worked as a soloist at the Azerbaijan State Opera and Ballet Theater. He created a number of characters in mugham operas on this stage: Majnun, Ibn-Salam, Karam (Uzeyir Hajibeyov – "Leyli and Majnun", "Asli and Kerem"), Ashig Garib (Zulfugar Hajibeyov – "Ashig Garib"), Shah Ismayil (Muslim Magomayev – "Shah Ismayil").

References

Source 
 

20th-century Azerbaijani male opera singers
Mugham singers
20th-century Azerbaijani educators
1928 births
1987 deaths